Tylopilus acutesquamosus is a bolete fungus in the family Boletaceae. It was described as new to science in 1983 from collections made in Amazonas, Brazil, where it was found growing on sandy soil.

References

External links

acutesquamosus
Fungi described in 1983
Fungi of Brazil
Taxa named by Rolf Singer